Baron Tersmeden (Swedish: Friherre Tersmeden), was a title in the Peerage of Sweden. It was created in 1809 for Fredrik Tersmeden, a member of the Tersmeden family. The last holder of the title was Adolf Tersmeden, 3rd Baron Tersmeden who inherited the title in 1879.

References 

Noble titles created in 1809
Tersmeden family